The 2022 FIM Women's Motocross World Championship is the 18th Women's Motocross World Championship season. Courtney Duncan is the defending champion, after taking her third title in 2021.

2022 Calendar
A 6-round calendar for the 2022 season was announced on 17 November 2021.

Participants

Riders Championship

Manufacturers Championship

References 

Motocross Women
Womens